Softeq Development Corporation is a privately-held, full-stack development company focusing on low-level programming (drivers, firmware,) hardware, (from PCBs to full-scale devices) and software apps for web, desktop, and mobile. It builds end-to-end IoT and cloud infrastructure solutions, and provides technology business consulting services. The company is headquartered in Houston, TX with development centers in Vilnius, Lithuania, and Monterrey, Mexico with offices in Munich, Germany, and London, United Kingdom. Softeq has over 500 employees globally.

History
Softeq was founded by Christopher A. Howard in Houston, Texas, the United States, in 1997. The name “Softeq” was coined from combining the terms "software" and "technical".  That year, the company secured Compaq as its first client.  The Compaq PC Theater  was developed by Softeq during the early days of the convergence of computers and television technology.  Softeq was involved in app development for the HP iPAQ handheld PDA.  In 2001, Compaq was acquired by Hewlett Packard.

In 2005, in partnership with Hewlett Packard and the Walt Disney Company, Softeq developed the DURATEQ 3100 which is a ruggedized handheld device for assistive listening and closed-caption delivery.  The system is installed in all Disney theme parks globally.  Additional installations include over 50 US National Parks, the World of Coca-Cola museum, New England Patriots Hall of Fame and the Dallas Cowboys AT&T Stadium.

In 2007, Softeq deployed a team of engineers to SanDisk to create advanced flash firmware and hardware visualization tools, technology that is present in cameras, PCs, laptops, PDAs, memory sticks, and other electronic devices.

In 2008, the company opened a full-stack research and development (R&D) center in High Tech Park located in Minsk, Belarus, which became its development center, and now has 300 employees.

In 2011, Softeq worked with NVIDIA for Bluetooth driver development, NVIDIA SHIELD streaming device, and an app for internal business operations. They also partnered with Intel Corporation for development of software, firmware, hardware and low power wireless chipsets and SOCs.

In 2018, Softeq acquired NearShore Solutions GmbH. which was rebranded as Softeq Development GmbH and becoming Softeq's European sales office in Munich, Germany.

In 2020, Softeq established a sales office in London, United Kingdom. In November 2020, Softeq Innovation Lab was launched, which is a virtual lab with online bootcamps for corporate executives and product teams.

In February 2021, Softeq opened a full-stack development center in Vilnius, Lithuania.  Later that year, the company launched a startup accelerator program – Softeq Venture Studio.

In 2022, Softeq Venture Fund, was created to provide capital to the Softeq Venture Studio.

Softeq is a Gold Application Development Partner of Microsoft, Xamarin Authorized Consulting Partner and an official member of Apple Inc.’s MFi Program.

Brands

DURATEQ
DURATEQ ATV is a rugged handheld device featuring Disney SyncLink Technology. The solution was built relying on content development services by MGBH Media Access Group and R&D efforts in the field of media accessibility for disabled people by the Accessible Learning and Assessment Technologies group of NCAM. DURATEQ is installed across multiple branches of the National Park Service, including George Washington's Mount Vernon, Walt Disney Parks and Resorts, the World of Coca-Cola Museum in Florida, the Hall at Patriot Place in Foxborough, MA, AT&T Stadium in Dallas, and the National Museum of the American Indian.

Softeq Venture Studio

Softeq Venture Studio is a startup accelerator established by Softeq in 2021. The studio offers engineering and startup formation services and funding to early-stage startups in exchange for equity in their company.  Participant enrollment began October 2021. In 2022, the studio organized two cohort cycles, bringing the total startups to 49. The lists of participants include startups in wellness, med-tech and sports-tech.

Softeq Venture Fund

Softeq Venture Fund is a $40 million venture fund for technology startups established in 2022. It provides capital to the Softeq Venture Studio and makes follow-on investments in seed and series A startup rounds in exchange for 6% equity in the eligible company. Jumana Capital, a single-family office from Houston, Texas, invested in the fund in 2022. Later that year, Royal Eagle Capital Partners – made a $3 million commitment.

Softeq Innovation Lab

Launched in Houston, TX in 2020, Softeq Innovation Lab is a virtual lab with online bootcamps for corporate executives and product teams working on innovation projects. Softeq Innovation Lab partners with the Massachusetts Institute of Technology and Massachusetts-based Boundless Technology. During the bootcamp, attendees collaborate with entrepreneurs (such as David Rose of Warby Parker) to design and build a working prototype. The lab covers such technological fields as IoT, AI, computer vision, AR, MR, etc.

Spinoffs

Softeq Flash Solutions 
The Softeq’s spin-off became part of SK Hynix's R&D center for flash memory products.  Softeq established a team of flash firmware and software engineers with experience in semiconductor and flash memory projects. The team was spun off as Softeq Flash Solutions.  In 2014, South Korean SK Hynix, the world's second largest memory chip maker acquired the NAND Flash memory development unit of Softeq in Minsk leading to the formation of Softeq Flash Solution LLC.

zGames 
zGames LLC, the game development brand of Softeq, was launched in 2008. The company provides full-cycle game design and development services and makes casual, mixed reality, educational, and gambling apps for mobile, desktop, web, VR, and AR. zGames also remade several classic game titles, including Pong World and QIX Galaxy.  In 2012, zGames won the Pong® Indie Developer Challenge by Atari, beating out over 100 other developers to recreate Pong for mobile gaming.  zGames was spun off in 2012.

References

Companies based in Houston
Companies established in 1997
Outsourcing companies
Companies based in Texas
Software companies of Belarus
Custom software projects